The Pennsylvania Magazine of History and Biography is a peer-reviewed academic journal covering the history of Pennsylvania. It has been published by the Historical Society of Pennsylvania since 1877. Issues from January 2006 forward are available online on the History Cooperatives Web. Past issues, from 1907 through 2004, are freely available through Penn State University's digital library collections. Issues from 1877 through 2003 are also available on JSTOR.

References

External links

History of Pennsylvania
Publications established in 1877
University of Pennsylvania Press academic journals
History of the United States journals
Quarterly journals
English-language journals
1877 establishments in Pennsylvania